Thomas Spens [de Spens] (c. 1415–15 April 1480), Scottish statesman and prelate, received his education at Edinburgh, was the second son of John de Spens, custodian of Prince James of Scotland, and of Lady Isabel Wemyss.

Biography

By his exceptional abilities, he attracted the notice the Scottish king, James II, who sent him on errands to England and to France, where he negotiated several treaties. About 1450 he became bishop of Galloway; soon afterwards he was made Keeper of the Privy Seal of Scotland, and in 1459 he was chosen bishop of Aberdeen.

Much of his time, however, was passed in journeys to France and to England, and in 1464 he and Alexander Stewart, duke of Albany, a son of James II, were captured at sea by some English sailors. Edward IV, to whom the bishop had previously revealed an assassination plot, set him at liberty, and he was perhaps partly responsible for the treaty of peace made about this time between the English king and James III.

He also helped to bring about the meeting between Edward IV and Louis XI of France at Picquigny, and another treaty of peace between England and Scotland in 1474. Spens was a frequent attender at the Scottish parliaments, and contributed very generously to the decoration of his cathedral at Aberdeen. In 1479 Spens founded a hospital dedicated to Mary at the foot of Leith Wynd in Edinburgh, catering for up to 12 poor men. A chapel later attached and dedicated to St Paul brought about the name of Paul's Hospital.

He died in Edinburgh on 15 April 1480 and was buried in the north aisle of Trinity College Kirk close to the hospital which he founded.

In 1582 Edinburgh council forbade "papists" from operating Paul's Hospital and in 1619 had the building rebuilt under the new name of "Paul's Work" which had a function both as hospice and as college. Five Dutchmen were brought to teach production of "coarse woollen stuffs" but this was not a success and around 1621 the building became a house of correction.

References

1415 births
1480 deaths
Bishops of Aberdeen
Bishops of Galloway (pre-Reformation)
People from Argyll and Bute
Scottish diplomats
15th-century Scottish Roman Catholic bishops
15th-century Roman Catholic bishops in Scotland